Oscar Álvarez may refer to:
Óscar Álvarez (footballer, 1948–2016), Argentine football striker
Óscar Álvarez (cyclist) (born 1977), Colombian road cyclist
Óscar Álvarez (footballer, born 1977), Spanish football manager and former centre-back
Óscar David Álvarez (born 1983), Colombian professional golfer
Oscar Álvarez (politician), Honduras Nationalist politician